Citizens' Movement for Change (MCC) is a Christian-democratic political party in the French Community of Belgium founded by Gérard Deprez in 1998.

Deprez was the leader of the Francophone Christian Social Party (PSC) from 1982 to 1995. He left the PSC, because he had failed to carry through his idea of forging a confederation of the PSC with the Liberal Reformist Party (PRL). Moreover, he had been discontent with the election of Charles-Ferdinand Nothomb as party leader. The last trigger to form a new party was the popular outrage at the government's mishandling of the controversy around the pedophile serial killer Marc Dutroux. The MCC immediately joined the alliance of the PRL and the regionalist Democratic Front of the Francophones (FDF) and ran on a joint PRL-FDF-MCC list for the elections in 1999. Deprez was elected to the European Parliament and sat with the group of the European People's Party (EPP-ED). The MCC supported the "purple-green" government coalition of Liberals, Socialists and Greens, while the PSC, for the first time in 50 years, was sent into opposition. PRL, FDF and MCC became components of the Reformist Movement in 2002.

In the 2004 European Parliamentary Election it elected one MEP (G. Deprez) on the MR ticket. This time, he chose to sit with his liberal allies in the Alliance of Liberals and Democrats for Europe (ALDE) Group. The MCC became part of the pan-European European Democratic Party (EDP).

See also  
Political parties in Belgium
Politics of Belgium

External links
Official website

References

Francophone political parties in Belgium
Centrist parties in Belgium
Christian democratic parties in Belgium
European Democratic Party
1998 establishments in Belgium
Political parties established in 1998